Esther Katarina Stensson (born 21 August 1988 in Örebro) is a Swedish politician and leader of the Swedish Pirate Party with a term from 2019–2021 Stensson took a masters exam in engineering physics at KTH Royal Institute of Technology in 2014 and a degree in licentiate in physics in 2018. Stensson is the Vice-President of the company "Checheza AB", a company focused on online classes. In 2020 she took the teacher's exam to work as a teacher in physics and mathematics.

Biography 
Between 2012 and 2014, Stensson was the project leader for organization Womengineer. In the year 2014 Stensson founded IGEday, a national event aimed at encourage girls to become engineers. Stensson had a seat in the board of directors for the free math-tutering service Mattecentrum from 2014–2017.

References 

Living people
People from Örebro
1988 births
Pirate Party (Sweden) politicians
21st-century Swedish politicians
21st-century Swedish women politicians